Libyan Constitution may refer to:

 Constitution of Libya (1951), the first constitution of Libya, in effect 1951–1969
 Constitution of Libya (1969)
 Declaration on the Establishment of the Authority of the People, an amendment to the 1969 constitution
 The Green Book (Muammar Gaddafi), published in 1975 and describing Muammar Gaddafi's political philosophy, was "intended to be read by all people"
 Libyan interim Constitutional Declaration, in effect 2011–2013
 2017 draft Libyan constitution, proposed in 2017 by a constituent assembly of 60 people elected in 2014